The  is an electric multiple unit (EMU) train type operated by the private railway operator Keisei Electric Railway on Narita Sky Access Line services.The top speed of Keisei 3100 series is 120 km/h.

Formation
 the fleet consists of six 8-car sets which are formed as follows. Car 1 is at the Narita Airport end.

Car 5 is equipped with one pantograph. Cars 2 and 7 are equipped with two pantographs each.

Interior
The interior includes passenger information displays, security cameras, and wheelchair spaces. Seating accommodation consists of longitudinal seating throughout and includes foldable seats, in order to provide more space for luggage. In addition, the seat backs are approximately  higher than those of the 3000 series.

History
Two eight-car sets were built in 2019. The trains entered service on 26 October 2019. Delivery of a third set, set 3153, began on 7 July 2020.

On 29 September 2021, it was announced by Keisei that new sets 3155 and 3156 were expected to enter service on 12 November and 30 September 2021, respectively. These two sets differ from preceding sets as they feature ladders at the end of cars 1 and 8 to allow for quick evacuation in the event of an emergency.

The 80000 series trains of Shin-Keisei Electric Railway are based on the 3100 series.

References

External links

 Official website 

Keisei Electric Railway
Electric multiple units of Japan
Train-related introductions in 2019
1500 V DC multiple units of Japan
Nippon Sharyo multiple units
J-TREC multiple units